Antti Jaatinen (born 24 September 1987) is a Finnish professional ice hockey defenceman currently playing for Jukurit of the Finnish Liiga.

During the 2011-12 season, Jaatinen played in JYP with his namesake, forward Antti-P Jaatinen.

References

External links

1987 births
Living people
People from Mäntyharju
Finnish ice hockey defencemen
JYP-Akatemia players
JYP Jyväskylä players
KeuPa HT players
Lahti Pelicans players
Lukko players
Mikkelin Jukurit players
Tappara players
Sportspeople from South Savo